"I Wanna Stay with You" is a song written and originally recorded by Scottish duo Gallagher & Lyle in 1976. It reached number six in the UK and number five in Ireland. The song was a modest hit in the United States and Canada.

Charts

Weekly Charts

Year-end Charts

Undercover cover

Scottish dance group Undercover recorded "I Wanna Stay with You" and included on their album Check Out the Groove. They released it as a single in January 1993, and it became a top-40 hit in parts of Europe.

Charts

References

External links
Lyrics of this song
 
 

1976 songs
1976 singles
1993 singles
Song recordings produced by Steve Mac
Songs written by Benny Gallagher
Songs written by Graham Lyle
Gallagher and Lyle songs
A&M Records singles
Pete Waterman Entertainment singles
Undercover (dance group) songs